William Henry (28 June 1859 – 20 March 1928), born Joseph Nawrocki, was an English competitive swimmer and lifesaver who represented Great Britain in international competition.

Biography
He was of Polish ancestry, and changed his original Polish surname Nawrocki to the English "Henry".   He was a co-founder of the Royal Life Saving Society. As a swimmer he won a number of national and European championships.  In 1906, at 46, he became the oldest ever Olympic medal winner in swimming as a member of the British men's 4×250-metre relay team which won the bronze medal. He won a gold medal in the 1900 Summer Olympics for Water Polo.

Henry is an International Swimming Hall of Fame inductee. He was the swimming instructor for the British Royal Family, using the swimming pool at the Bath Club, Dover Street. He helped to formalise the rules of water polo. With Archibald Sinclair (1866–1922), he wrote a book on swimming for the Badminton Library.

Death
He died in the St Pancras district of London, aged 68. He was buried with his wife Elizabeth at Highgate Cemetery, with a memorial above the grave paid for by members and friends of the Royal Life Saving Society.

See also
 Great Britain men's Olympic water polo team records and statistics
 List of Olympic medalists in swimming (men)
 List of Olympic medalists in water polo (men)
 List of Olympic champions in men's water polo
 List of men's Olympic water polo tournament goalkeepers
 List of members of the International Swimming Hall of Fame

References

External links

 

1859 births
1928 deaths
Burials at Highgate Cemetery
People from St Pancras, London
Sportspeople from London
English male freestyle swimmers
Male long-distance swimmers
Olympic swimmers of Great Britain
Water polo goalkeepers
British male water polo players
Olympic water polo players of Great Britain
Swimmers at the 1900 Summer Olympics
Swimmers at the 1906 Intercalated Games
Water polo players at the 1900 Summer Olympics
Medalists at the 1906 Intercalated Games
Olympic gold medallists for Great Britain
English people of Polish descent
British male backstroke swimmers